Formosa is the capital city of the Argentine province of Formosa, on the banks of the Paraguay River, opposite the Paraguayan city of Alberdi, about  north from Buenos Aires, on National Route 11.

Formosa is the hub of the provincial industry, that processes the product of its natural resources. The port that serves Paraguay towards the Paraná River is the main transport means for the provincial production.

Notable sights of the city include the Nuestra Señora del Carmen Cathedral, the Government House, the Torelli Botanic Forest Garden, the Provincial History Museum (Museo Histórico Provincial), the Estadio Centenario ("Centenary Stadium") football stadium, the Guaicole fauna reserve,  the shore of the Paraguay River, the Isla de Oro Island, and the Central Square named after José de San Martín.

History 
The lands were initially inhabited by the Toba and Wichí (Mataco) indigenous peoples. On April 8, 1879 Commander Luis Jorge Fontana founded the settlement that would become the capital of the National Territory of Chaco from 1884 to June 15, 1955, when it gained the status of province. The Formosa campus of the National University of the Northeast was established as the National University of Formosa in 1988. 

The name of the city (and the province) comes from the archaic Spanish word fermosa (currently hermosa) meaning "beautiful". The name Vuelta Fermosa or Vuelta la Formosa was used by Spanish sailors in the 16th century to describe the area where the Paraguay River makes a turn, right in front of the actual city. These sailors were searching for the legendary Sierra de la Plata.

Culture 
The city, which is only a few hundred meters away from Paraguay across the river, has a culture closer to that of Paraguay than the "porteño" culture of Buenos Aires.  Laid back and relaxed, its young people relax on the Costanera, the recently restored pathway along the Río Paraguay which serves as a venue for arts displays and features a fast-food restaurant, or at boliches, local clubs. The city's well-known cultural institutions include the Formosa Regional Historical Museum, the Juan Pablo Duffard Historical Museum (a National Historic Monument), the Qomp Toba Artisanal Museum, and the Oscar Albertazzi Arts Institute.

The city has, since the 1970s, enjoyed increasing domestic tourism as a winter destination and, since the devaluation of the peso in 2002, growing international tourism, as well. Formosa is currently home to one five-star hotel (the International Tourist Hotel) and four four-star hotels. One other five-star establishment, the Howard Johnson Neo Formosa, was completed in July 2011 and features a casino and shopping gallery. 23,000-capacity Estadio Don Carlos Antonio Romero, used mainly for association football, is the main venue in Formosa.

Festivals 

Formosa celebrates Our Lady of Carmen (Nuestra Señora del Carmen), its patron saint, on July 16 in honor of its holy day.  Celebrations, which occur in the main Plaza San Martín, include the traditional pericón dance and stalls selling everything from food to balloons.

It also celebrates the Fiesta del Río in November, Carnaval on weekends in February and Día de la Fundación de Formosa in April.

Transport

Located in the Argentine Littoral, Formosa is well connected to the rest of the country, the most used ways to go to and from Formosa, are through: 

The Formosa Bus Terminal Station, which goes to medium and long distances, with great passenger movement throughout the year. Several national and international transport companies operate in the city, whose most common destinations are Buenos Aires, Rosario, Corrientes, Resistencia, Córdoba, Mendoza, Posadas, Salta and Clorinda-Asunción.

The El Pucú Airport , 7 kilometres south of the city , serves charter flights, and regular flights to Buenos Aires.

The Port of Formosa, with boat services to and from Alberdi, Paraguay.

The General Belgrano Railway, which is currently not in operation. In the branch near the port, its tracks were dismantled and the building where the station was located was converted into a museum, while the sheds of its mechanical workshops were converted into a large fair.

The Public and Semi-public Transportation of Passengers: the city of Formosa has modern transportation units, reaching international standards, also providing the user with air conditioning and wifi while traveling; There are also taxi and remiss agencies.

From Buenos Aires, the highways to take are the: National Route A011, National Route 86 and National Route 12.

Geography

Climate 
 
The city has a climate considered as humid subtropical or Cfa by Köppen classification. The city's climate is among the hottest and most humid in Argentina: Winters are generally mild, air frosts are very uncommon. Summers are hot and humid. During the most extreme heat waves, temperatures exceed . Temperatures have exceeded  in every season.

Cooler temperatures only arrive by late April, and winters are warm: highs average , lows average .

Rainfall can be expected throughout the year though summer is usually the wettest season. Thunderstorms can be intense with frequent lightning, powerful gusts of wind and intense precipitation.

Sister cities
 Asunción, Paraguay
 Bella Unión, Uruguay

Images

Notable people
Franco Llamas, footballer

References

External links 

  (Spanish)
 
 National University of Formosa (Spanish)

 
Populated places established in 1879
Populated places in Formosa Province
Capitals of Argentine provinces
Cities in Argentina
Argentina
Formosa Province